This is a list of some of the breeds of horse considered in Brazil to be of Brazilian origin. Some may have complex or obscure histories, so inclusion here does not necessarily imply that a breed is predominantly or exclusively Brazilian.

 Baixadeiro
 Brazilian Sport Horse or Brasileiro de Hipismo
 Brazilian Andalusian
 Brazilian Pony
 Campolina
 Campeiro
 Crioulo
 Lavradeiro
 Mangalarga or Mangalarga Paulista
 Mangalarga Marchador
 Marajoara
 Nordestino
 Pantaneiro
 Pampa
 Piquira
 Puruca

References

 
Brazilian horses